Hotsonite is a mineral with the formula ([[Al11(PO4)2(SO4)3(OH)21.16H2O]]. The name derived from the farm Hotson 42, located 65 km west of the town of Pofadder, in Bushmanland, northwestern Cape Province, South Africa. This is an arid region with an average rainfall of 3 inches per annum. The name was approved by the Commission on New Minerals and Mineral Names of the International Mineralogical Association (July 1983). It is chemically related to sanjuanite and kribergite.

Discovery and occurrence

Hotsonite was discovered while investigating for aluminous metamorphic rocks in an abandoned sillimanite quarry in 1982. The two senior authors sampled peculiar veins and encrustations of cryptocrystalline fine-grained white material. One of the materials had properties which could not be matched to any known mineral.

The mineral occurs closely with zaherite, Al12(SO4)5(SO4)3(OH)26.20H2O.

Physical properties

Hotsonite's physical properties are similar to other hydrated aluminous sulfates and some phosphates. It occurs as a white chalk like mineral with a dull to silky luster, and an earthy fracture. When observed under magnification of 500 times, it has a flaky appearance. Hotsonite appears with a white coloration, and small grain size. The Mohs hardness is  2.5, and with a density value of 2.060 to 2.068.

Chemical composition
The chemical analysis was carried out using X-ray fluorescence, and the water was calculated by the Penfield method.

Diffraction information

Powder diffraction used for hotsonite data:

References

Phosphate minerals
Sulfate minerals
Aluminium minerals
Triclinic minerals
Minerals in space group 2